Nicolás "Nico" Cháfer García (born 11 February 1991 in Gandia, Valencian Community), sometimes known as just Nico, is a Spanish footballer who plays for CD Guadalajara as an attacking midfielder.

External links

1991 births
Living people
People from Gandia
Sportspeople from the Province of Valencia
Spanish footballers
Footballers from the Valencian Community
Association football midfielders
Segunda División players
Segunda División B players
Tercera División players
Villarreal CF C players
Villarreal CF B players
UD Melilla footballers
CD Leganés players
Elche CF Ilicitano footballers
CD Alcoyano footballers
CD San Roque de Lepe footballers
UD Alzira footballers
CD Eldense footballers
CD Guadalajara (Spain) footballers